Application performance engineering is a method to develop and test application performance in various settings, including mobile computing, the cloud, and conventional information technology (IT).

Methodology

According to the National Institute of Standards and Technology, nearly four out of every five dollars spent on the total cost of ownership of an application is directly attributable to finding and fixing issues post-deployment. A full one-third of this cost could be avoided with better software testing. 

Application performance engineering attempts to test software before it is published.   While practices vary among organizations, the method attempts to emulate the real-world conditions that software in development will confront, including network deployment and access by mobile devices.  Techniques include network virtualization.

See also
 Network virtualization
 Performance engineering
 Service virtualization
 Software performance testing

References

Further reading
 Practical Performance Analyst - Performance Engineering Community & Body Of Knowledge
 "Application performance engineering," Computerworld. January 28, 2011.
 The Mandate for Application Performance Engineering by Jim Metzler.
 Application Performance Engineering: A Lifecycle Approach to Achieving Confidence in Application Performance
  Application Performance Engineering Hub Blog
  The 2011 Application & Service Delivery Handbook

Application software
Software testing